Michael Paul Martin (born 9 July 1951) is an Irish former professional footballer, best known for his time at Manchester United, West Bromwich Albion and Newcastle United. He also represented the Republic of Ireland national football team more than 50 times.

Born in Dublin, he played for Bohemians, Manchester United, West Bromwich Albion, Newcastle United, Vancouver Whitecaps, Cardiff City, Peterborough United, Rotherham United, Preston North End and the Republic of Ireland, for whom he won a total of 51 caps. His first cap was against Austria in October 1971 and his last against Spain in April 1983.

A devoted Aston Villa supporter, he played his schoolboy football mainly at Home Farm before signing for Seán Thomas's Bohemians in 1968. He spent a year learning his trade in the youth team and "B" team before progressing to the first team, where he made his debut against Dundalk. He soon became a regular in the side, which competed at the top end of the table. When Martin excelled in a league match against Shelbourne in January 1973, the watching Manchester United manager Tommy Docherty liked what he saw and within 48 hours, Martin was on his way to Old Trafford. He spent two years at United before Johnny Giles took him to West Brom in 1975. Martin moved to Newcastle United for £100,000 in 1978 and spent five years at the club, making 147 appearances and scoring five goals.

After retiring as a player, Martin had spells on the coaching staff at Newcastle and under Liam Brady at Celtic. Martin was also a regular match summariser on Metro Radio and won a Sony Gold award with Magic 1152 along with Justin Lockwood for the coverage of Alan Shearer's testimonial.

His father, Con Martin, was also a Republic of Ireland international and played professionally for Aston Villa; his brother Con Martin Jr. played for Bohemians among others; and his nephew Owen Garvan last played for Colchester United.

References

Living people
1951 births
Bohemian F.C. players
Cardiff City F.C. players
Expatriate footballers in England
Expatriate footballers in Wales
Expatriate soccer players in Canada
Association football midfielders
League of Ireland players
Home Farm F.C. players
Irish expatriate sportspeople in Canada
Irish expatriate sportspeople in England
Irish expatriate sportspeople in Wales
Manchester United F.C. players
Newcastle United F.C. players
North American Soccer League (1968–1984) players
Association footballers from Dublin (city)
Peterborough United F.C. players
Preston North End F.C. players
Republic of Ireland association footballers
Republic of Ireland international footballers
Republic of Ireland under-23 international footballers
Rotherham United F.C. players
Shamrock Rovers F.C. guest players
Vancouver Whitecaps (1974–1984) players
West Bromwich Albion F.C. players
Willington A.F.C. players
Celtic F.C. non-playing staff